Baseball at the 2007 South Pacific Games was contested by five teams. Palau won the gold medal, New Caledonia won the silver, American Samoa won the bronze. Fiji and Samoa were the other participating nations.

Tournament

Because of bad weather conditions, the final medal rounds were cancelled, and the medal places were awarded upon round-robin results.

Final standings

Results
All five participating nations played a round-robin format.

See also
Baseball at the South Pacific Games
Baseball in Palau

References
2007 South Pacific Games - Baseball at SportingPulse

2007 South Pacific Games
South Pacific Games
2007 South